Hippomachus or Hippomakhos or Hippomachos (Ancient Greek: Ἱππόμαχον or Ἱππόμαχος means "fighting on horseback, trooper") may refer to:

 Hippomachus, a Trojan warrior and son of Antimachus. He was the brother of Hippolochus, Pisander, and Tisiphone. During the Trojan War, Hippomachus was killed by Leonteus, leader of the Lapiths, who smote him with a cast of his spear, striking him upon the girdle.
 Hippomachus, one of the Suitors of Penelope. He came from Zacynthos along with other 43 wooers. Hippomachus was ultimately killed by Odysseus with the help of Eumaeus, Philoetius, and Telemachus, after returning from his 10-year journey.
Hippomachus of Elis, an ancient Greek who won three opponents in an Olympic boxing competition for boys without receiving a blow.

Notes

References 

 Apollodorus, The Library with an English Translation by Sir James George Frazer, F.B.A., F.R.S. in 2 Volumes, Cambridge, MA, Harvard University Press; London, William Heinemann Ltd. 1921. ISBN 0-674-99135-4. Online version at the Perseus Digital Library. Greek text available from the same website.
Homer, The Iliad with an English Translation by A.T. Murray, Ph.D. in two volumes. Cambridge, MA., Harvard University Press; London, William Heinemann, Ltd. 1924. . Online version at the Perseus Digital Library.
 Homer, Homeri Opera in five volumes. Oxford, Oxford University Press. 1920. . Greek text available at the Perseus Digital Library.
 Quintus Smyrnaeus, The Fall of Troy translated by Way. A. S. Loeb Classical Library Volume 19. London: William Heinemann, 1913. Online version at theio.com
 Quintus Smyrnaeus, The Fall of Troy. Arthur S. Way. London: William Heinemann; New York: G.P. Putnam's Sons. 1913. Greek text available at the Perseus Digital Library.

Trojans
Suitors of Penelope